The 2009–10 Euro Hockey League was the third season of the Euro Hockey League, Europe's premier club field hockey tournament organized by the EHF.

The final was played between UHC Hamburg and Rotterdam at the Wagener Stadium in Amstelveen, Netherlands. UHC Hamburg beat Rotterdam 3–1 to win their second title. Bloemendaal were the title holders, but were eliminated by UHC Hamburg in the quarter-finals.

Association team allocation

A total of 24 teams from 12 of the 45 EHF member associations participated in the 2019–20 Euro Hockey League. The association ranking based on the EHL country coefficients is used to determine the number of participating teams for each association:
 Associations 1–4 each have three teams qualify.
 Associations 5–8 each have two teams qualify.
 Associations 9–12 each have one team qualify.

Association ranking

Teams

Round one
In each group, teams played against each other once in a round-robin format. The group winners and runners-up advanced to the round of 16. Pools A, C, D, and F were played in Paris, France, between 23 and 25 October 2009 and the other pools were played in Barcelona, Spain, between 9 and 11 October 2009. If a game was won, the winning team received 5 points. A draw resulted in both teams receiving 2 points. A loss gave the losing team 1 point unless the losing team lost by 3 or more goals, then they received 0 points.

Pool A

Pool B

Pool C

Pool D

Pool E

Pool F

Pool G

Pool H

Knockout stage
The Round of 16 and the quarterfinals were played in Rotterdam, Netherlands between 2 and 5 April 2010 and the semifinals, third place match and the final were played in Amstelveen, Netherlands between 22 and 23 May 2010. Matches that ended in a draw would then play two periods of 7.5 minutes, with the "Silver Goal" rule being enforced. Matches that remain tied at the end of extra time were settled by a penalty shoot-out.

Bracket

Round of 16

Quarter-finals

Semi-finals

Bronze place match

Final

Statistics

Top goalscorers

Test Rules 
The Euro Hockey League is considered to be something of a pioneer when it comes to rules and regulations. The tournament has introduced various test rules which have now been adopted by the global game, with the "Self Pass" - which allows players to dribble with the ball from a free hit rather than passing it - being arguably the most revolutionary. The 2009-2010 Season saw the introduction of the "Own Goal" trial, which meant that defenders and goalkeepers could no longer force the ball into their own net when an opposing player has hit the ball from outside the circle. The first ever own goal in hockey arrived during Round 1.1, when Atletic Terrassa's Xavi Ribas accidentally deflected into his own goal during their match against Reading HC of England. In total, five own goals were scored during the 2009-2010 season. [2]

References

External links 
 Official Website (English)

Euro Hockey League
2009–10 in European field hockey